Meadows is an unincorporated community located in Prince George's County, Maryland, United States, located near the east end of Joint Base Andrews.

Notable person

Ray Moore, baseball player.

References

Unincorporated communities in Prince George's County, Maryland
Unincorporated communities in Maryland